The following is a list of hospitals in Singapore registered by the Ministry of Health.

Acute hospitals

Community hospitals

Psychiatric hospital

Upcoming hospitals
New hospital in Bedok North
Woodlands Health Campus

Defunct hospitals
 British Military Hospital: Predecessor of Alexandra Hospital
 Changi Hospital: Merged with Toa Payoh Hospital to form Changi General Hospital on 15 February 1997.
 Toa Payoh Hospital: Merged with Changi Hospital to form Changi General Hospital on 15 February 1997.
View Road Hospital: Used to be a subsidiary of Institute of Mental Health (Singapore), but ceased operations in 2001.

See also
Assisi Hospice
Camden Medical Centre
National Centre for Infectious Diseases
Singapore Cord Blood Bank
Singapore Gamma Knife Centre
Fullerton Health Group

References

External links
 Official list(pages 1-4) maintained by the Ministry of Health

 
Singapore
Hospitals
Singapore